Juan Antonio Saavedra Reinaldo (born 21 November 1973 in Pontevedra) is a shooter from Spain.

Personal 
He has a disability, and is Galician. In 2013, he was awarded the silver Real Orden al Mérito Deportivo.

Shooting 
Saavedra is an SH1-SH2 type shooter.

He competed at the 2000 Summer Paralympics, 2004 Summer Paralympics and 2012 Summer Paralympics. At the 2012 Games, he earned a silver in the Free rifle lying R6, Mixed gender SH1 event.

He competed at the 2013 Spanish national championships, where finished first in the R3  event by beating Catalan shooter Miquel Orobitg and fellow Galician Manuel Brage who finished third.  He also finished first in the R5 event. Competing at the 2013 IPC European Championships, he finished first in the R3 event.

References

External links 
  (2000, 2004)
  (2010–2018)
 

1973 births
Living people
Spanish male sport shooters
Paralympic shooters of Spain
Paralympic silver medalists for Spain
Paralympic medalists in shooting
Shooters at the 2000 Summer Paralympics
Shooters at the 2004 Summer Paralympics
Shooters at the 2012 Summer Paralympics
Medalists at the 2012 Summer Paralympics
Sportspeople from Pontevedra
Shooters at the 2020 Summer Paralympics
21st-century Spanish people